CBDB may refer to:

 China Biographical Database (CBDB), a joint project of Harvard University, Peking University, and Academic Sinica
 CBDB (band), an American Band from Tuscaloosa, AL
 CBDB (AM), a radio rebroadcaster (990 AM) licensed to Watson Lake, Yukon, Canada, rebroadcasting CFWH

See also
 Comic Book Database